Jorge Maria O'Neill (Lisbon, Encarnação, 7 November 1908 – Lisbon, 15 December 1988) was the head of a branch of the Clanaboy O'Neill dynasty, which has resided in Portugal since the 18th century.

Recognition
He was officially recognized by the heraldic societies throughout Europe as titular Prince and Count of Clanaboy, but refused to use the title, preferring instead the style O'Neill of Clannaboy. He was the first son of the previous head Hugo José Jorge O'Neill and wife Dona Júlia Margarida Catarina de Serpa Pimentel de Sousa Coutinho. He was also Viscount of Santa Mónica, in Portugal.

Life
Jorge O'Neill was an Electronic Engineer graduating from the University of Lausanne, Switzerland. He was recognized by the Chief Herald of Ireland as Chief of the Name for the O'Neill of Clannaboy.

Marriage and issue
Jorge Maria O'Neill married in Cascais, on 23 December 1937 Josefina Luísa Roquette Ricciardi (Lisbon, Camões, 5 April 1917 – Lisbon, Alcântara, 11 April 2004), daughter of Luís Rafael Feliciano da Conceição Ricciardi and wife Julieta Garin Holtreman Roquette. They had five children:

 Hugo Ricciardi O'Neill (born Lisbon, Encarnação, 7 March 1939)
 Maria Madalena Ricciardi O'Neill (born Lisbon, Alcântara, 13 September 1940), married Chapel of the Quinta das Machadas, São Julião, Setúbal, 7 September 1961 Gonçalo Dinís Pinheiro de Melo (born Cascais, Casa de São Bernardo, 18 November 1931), son of Bernardo Miguel António Pinheiro de Melo and wife Maria Luísa Anjos Dinís,{{Of Irish and Scottish descent.}} and had four children
 Teresa Maria Ricciardi O'Neill (born Lisbon, Alcântara, 26 March 1942), married Chapel of the Quinta das Machadas, São Julião, Setúbal, on 16 September 1966 Luís Filipe Mayer da Câmara Pina (born Lisbon, Encarnação, 13 May 1938), son of Luís Maria Portocarrero da Câmara Pina and wife Marta Maria de Lima Mayer, and had three children
 Margarida Maria Ricciardi O'Neill (born Lisbon, Alcântara, 18 January 1944), married civilly at the 5th Conservatory of the Civil Registry of Lisbon 18 April 1986 José Lourenço de Sá da Luz Coruche (born Lisbon, São Sebastião da Pedreira, 1 March 1947), son of Fernando Luís Lavin da Luz Coruche< and wife Maria da Assunção de Sá Pereira Coutinho Sotomaior, without issue
 Maria Isabel Ricciardi O'Neill (born Lisbon, Alcântara, 23 March 1947), married civilly at the 4th Conservatory of the Civil Registry of Lisbon 6 January 1984 José António de Sampaio de Abreu Valente (born Lisbon, São Jorge de Arroios, 21 April 1952), son of José Luís Alves Dinís de Abreu Valente and wife Maria Antónia de Lima Rosa Coelho de Sampaio, and had issue.

See also
 Irish nobility
 Irish kings
 Irish royal families
 O'Neill (surname)
 Uí Néill, the Irish Dynasty
 Ó Neill Dynasty Today
 O'Neill of Clannaboy

Notes

References

External links
 Jorge Maria O'Neill's Genealogy in a Portuguese Genealogical site
 

1908 births
1988 deaths
Irish lords
Portuguese nobility
Portuguese people of Irish descent
Connachta
O'Neill dynasty
People from Lisbon